In Missouri, odd-numbered highways run north-south and even-numbered highways run east-west (with a few exceptions, such as Route 112).  Missouri also maintains a secondary set of roads, supplemental routes, which are lettered rather than numbered.

Missouri has also changed highway designations with a US route or an interstate with the same number is designated through the state (Route 40 was redesignated Route 14 to avoid duplicating numbers with US-40 which also passes through the state). There are a few instances of number duplication between federal and state highways (such as with Route 72 and I-72), but any such pairs of highways are nowhere near each other to avoid confusion.

In some states (such as Arkansas and New Mexico), highways are allowed to be discontinuous.  Missouri overlaps highways in order to maintain continuity.

The Missouri Department of Transportation routinely uses the term "Route" in reference to the names of the roads.  However, Missouri statutes define them as "State Highways".  Missourians may use the terms "Route" and "Highway" interchangeably when referring to a state road.

See also

References

External links
Missouri Department of Transportation website
Official MoDOT Travel Information Map
Official current and historical Missouri road maps
Kansas City Scout - KC area intelligent transportation system
St. Louis Metro area intelligent transportation program website
Road Signs of Missouri
Missouri Highways (unofficial)